Penthouse Court Apartments, today called Les Jardins of South Beach Condominium, is an historic property with Mediterranean Revival architecture  and Art Deco features, located at 1620-22 Pennsylvania Avenue, Miami Beach, Florida, USA and is in the Miami Beach Architectural District, Florida, USA.

It was Designed by Martin L. Hampton who was a renowned architect in the 20's and 30's. He is best known his work in Miami, Miami Beach, Coral Gables and Hollywood.  Among his most notable projects are the Great Southern Hotel of Hollywood (1924), The Bathing Casino of Hollywood (1925), the Country Club of Coral Gables (1923) and the Miami Beach City Hall (1927).

In the late 1930s, investment in the real estate in the Miami Beach area became popular,  so the Architect started to design  Mediterranean Revival houses and apartments in the South Beach area,  especially around Flamingo Park. Penthouse Courts was built during this period and is an evident expression of this style.

The apartments are distributed in two symmetrical buildings of three floors. For each building, the first and second floors have three apartments as well as one penthouse on the third floor. Each building has two balconies on the second floor and one on the third floor, all of them in typical Mediterranean Style. The roof is of Spanish tile. The entrance is an iron "flamingo" gate that opens up on to a beautiful tropical garden. Inside the building the original iron staircase railings hand forged in the 30s  are still strongly in place together with an iron gate leading to the Penthouse on the 3rd floor.

Building permit 6240 was released by the City of Miami Beach in 1934 and the building was completed in 1935 in the Art Deco Area of South Beach. It is listed in the City of Miami Beach Historic Property Viewer 

A list of Martin L. Hampton's work can be found on the National Register of Historic Places on page 17 of the Nomination Form of the Congress Building.  Penthouse Court is listed as designed by the architect in 1934.

Located one block from Lincoln Road the apartments are famous for their beautiful mosaics both in the common areas and garden and also throughout the stairwells and some interiors of both buildings. These unique mosaics enrich this property and complete the Mediterranean vibe.

The building is listed on the RuskinaARC historic datatabase

Penthouse Court Vintage Photos
Original design by L. Hampton featured 14 units with a tropical garden in the front, parking area in the back of the building and entrance was via Pennsylvania Avenue.
The building has not been modified  since its original design, is still in its original Art Deco form, each of the two buildings is still divided in 7 units.
From the vintage pictures the penthouse apartments on the third floor, the mediterranean balconies, the tropical garden and the parking area are all visible.
The Lincoln Theater can also be spotted in the  photos just half a block away from Penthouse Court Apartments.

Penthouse Court Mosaics
The building is decorated with beautiful mosaics that enhance the interior and exterior of the building.

References

External links 
 Ruskinarc organize Art Deco architecture in the US. Search Ruskinarc Database.
 The National Register of Historic Places is the official list of the Nation's historic places worthy of preservation. Search National Register of Historic Places.
 A Pioneer Architect leaves a Mark on City journal on Martin L. Hampton work



Geography of Miami-Dade County, Florida
Buildings and structures in Miami Beach, Florida
Art Deco architecture in Florida
Mediterranean Revival architecture